Arlington is a village in Washington County, Nebraska, United States. The population was 1,243 at the 2010 census. Arlington is named after Arlington, Virginia.

History
Arlington was originally called Bell Creek (after nearby Bell Creek) and under the latter name was platted in 1869 when the Sioux City and Pacific Railroad was extended to that point. Due to similarity in name with another place in Nebraska, Bell Creek was renamed Arlington, after the city of Arlington, Virginia, in 1882. Arlington was home to the Marshall Nurseries, an internationally acclaimed nursery credited with inventing the fraxinus pennsylvanica tree species, one of the most common green ash trees planted in the United States of America. Recent history includes the accidental damage to the north wall of the post office.

Geography
Arlington is located at  (41.454244, -96.357246).

Notable person
Arlington was once home to Molly Ringwald's great-great grandmother.

Demographics

2010 census
As of the census of 2010, there were 1,243 people, 495 households, and 344 families living in the village. The racial makeup of the village was 97.9% White, 0.1% African American, 0.3% Native American, 0.5% Asian, 0.7% from other races, and 0.5% from two or more races. Hispanic or Latino of any race were 2.7% of the population.

There were 495 households, of which 38.6% had children under the age of 18 living with them, 57.2% were married couples living together, 8.5% had a female householder with no husband present, 3.8% had a male householder with no wife present, and 30.5% were non-families. 27.1% of all households were made up of individuals, and 14.7% had someone living alone who was 65 years of age or older. The average household size was 2.51 and the average family size was 3.06.

The median age in the village was 38.3 years. 28.2% of residents were under the age of 18; 5.9% were between the ages of 18 and 24; 25.7% were from 25 to 44; 25.1% were from 45 to 64; and 15.2% were 65 years of age or older. The gender makeup of the village was 48.7% male and 51.3% female.

2000 census
As of the census of 2000, there were 1,197 people, 475 households, and 342 families living in the village. The population density was 2,104.3 people per square mile (810.8/km2). There were 492 housing units at an average density of 864.9 per square mile (333.3/km2). The racial makeup of the village was 98.75% White, 0.08% Native American, 0.17% Asian, 0.08% Pacific Islander, 0.17% from other races, and 0.75% from two or more races. Hispanic or Latino of any race were 1.09% of the population.

There were 475 households, out of which 36.2% had children under the age of 18 living with them, 59.8% were married couples living together, 7.2% had a female householder with no husband present, and 27.8% were non-families. 25.9% of all households were made up of individuals, and 14.3% had someone living alone who was 65 years of age or older. The average household size was 2.52 and the average family size was 3.01.

In the village, the population was spread out, with 27.7% under the age of 18, 6.9% from 18 to 24, 28.4% from 25 to 44, 23.1% from 45 to 64, and 14.0% who were 65 years of age or older. The median age was 38 years. For every 100 females, there were 92.8 males. For every 100 females age 18 and over, there were 89.5 males.

As of 2000 the median income for a household in the village was $45,365, and the median income for a family was $51,250. Males had a median income of $35,083 versus $24,615 for females. The per capita income for the village was $19,453. About 3.3% of families and 3.7% of the population were below the poverty line, including 5.5% of those under age 18 and 3.5% of those age 65 or over.

References

External links
Arlington Public Schools website
Local newspaper website

Villages in Nebraska
Villages in Washington County, Nebraska